Grace Ellliston (1878 or 1881 – December 14, 1950) was an American theatre actress.

Elliston was born Grace Rutter in Memphis, Tennessee. In 1899, she appeared in the Broadway play Wheels Within Wheels. Her Broadway appearances included The Country Cousin, The Shadow, Arizona, The Rector's Garden, The Helmet of Navarre, Her Husband's Wife, Ourselves, The Lion and the Mouse and A Blot in the 'Scutcheon, among others. Her final Broadway credit was The Lucky One in 1922.

Elliston died in December 1950 at the Crestwood Nursing Home in Lenox, Massachusetts.  She was cremated.

References

External links  

1870s births
1880s births
1950 deaths
People from Memphis, Tennessee
Actresses from Tennessee
American stage actresses
20th-century American actresses